Ulutogia is a village on the east coast of Upolu island in Samoa. The village is part of the electoral constituency (Faipule District) Aleipata Itupa i Luga which is part of the political district of Atua. It has a population of 202.

Ulutogia is approximately 1 hour and 20 minutes' drive from Apia, the country's capital.

The High Chief (Ali'i Taua) title name of the village is Sagapolutele.

Ulutogia is also home to a famous saying (Alagaupu), "Ua togi pa tau i le 'ave." (The breadfruit was hit on the stalk)

2009 Samoa tsunami
Ulutogia was heavily damaged in the 2009 Samoa tsunami with fatalities  following an earthquake south of the Samoa Islands on 29 September 2009. However, the village has slowly recovered in a rebuilding programme with international aid and support.

References

Populated places in Atua (district)